The Netball NSW Premier League is a state netball league featuring teams mainly from New South Wales. The league is organised by Netball New South Wales. The Premier League was first played for during the 2016 season. It replaced the Dooleys State League's Waratah Cup as the top level netball competition in New South Wales. On a national level, the Premier League  is effectively a third level league. NNSWPL teams compete in two divisions – the Opens and the Under-23s.

History

Earlier state leagues
The Premier League replaced the Dooleys State League's Waratah Cup as the top level netball competition in New South Wales. Several of the netball associations that entered teams in the Waratah Cup successfully applied to enter franchises in the Premier League. These included the Eastwood Ryde Netball Association, the Manly Warringah Netball Association and the Sutherland Shire Netball Association  who respectively formed ERNA Hawks, Manly Warringah Sapphires and Sutherland Stingrays.

2016
The Netball NSW Premier League was first played for during the 2016 season. The eight founding franchises were Central Coast Heart, ERNA Hawks, GWS Fury, Manly Warringah Sapphires, North Shore United, Panthers, Sutherland Stingrays and UTS St George Sparks. Sutherland Stingrays were crowned the inaugural Opens Champions after an defeating Manly
Warringah Sapphires 50–49 in the grand final. Panthers were the inaugural Under-20 premiers.

2017
Manly Warringah Sapphires won the 2017 Opens title after defeating a UTS St George Sparks team featuring Kristina Brice and Beryl Friday, 59–56 in the grand final. A Sparks team featuring Matilda McDonell defeated Panthers 55–49 in the 
Under-20 grand final.

2018
In 2018, Amy Wild captained Central Coast Heart as they defeated ERNA Hawks 60–55 in the Open's grand final. Wild was also awarded both the Netball NSW President's Medal as the Grand Final MVP and the Nance Kenny OAM Medal as the NNSWPL Player of the Year. In the Under-20 grand final, North Shore United defeated GWS Fury 56–44.

2019
ERNA Hawks won the 2019 Opens title after defeating Central Coast Heart 68–44 in the grand final. The under-20 competition was now changed to an under-23 competition. GWS Fury became the first Under-23 champions after defeating Manly Warringah Sapphires 60–52
in the grand final. After the first four seasons of the NNSWPL, all the original eight franchises have being crowned champions at least once in either the Under-20s, Under-23s or Opens.

2020
The 2020 season saw the addition of two new franchises – The Capital Spirit and South Coast Blaze. Due to the COVID-19 pandemic, the season took place later in the year. It also featured a new condensed format. In both the Opens and Under-23 divisions, teams were split into two conferences. All teams played the other teams in their conference twice and each team in the other conference once. The top two teams from each conference then contested a two-week finals series. In the Opens division, North Shore United, coached by Rebecca Bulley, were crowned champions after a 56–44 grand final win over ERNA Hawks. In the Under-23 grand final, UTS Randwick Sparks defeated South Coast Blaze 44–32.

2021
With the minor rounds almost complete, the 2021 season was initially suspended and then abandoned after a public health order caused the closure of Netball Central due to the COVID-19 pandemic.

2022
Ahead of the 2022 season a new format was announced for both the Opens and Under-23s. There will be 14 regular rounds with all teams playing each other once in the opening nine before they split into conferences for the final five. All teams will play their respective conference opponents once between Rounds 10 and 14. The top three sides from each conference will then progress to the finals series.

Teams

Notes
  UTS Randwick Sparks originally played as UTS St George Sparks.
  Panthers Netball are affiliated with Penrith Panthers.

Venues
Since 2016, Netball Central has been the host venue for the Netball NSW Premier League.

Media coverage
Between 2016 and 2020, NNSWPL matches were live streamed across Netball New South Wales's social media channels by BarTV Sports. The lead commentator was ABC Grandstand's Brittany Carter. Her co-commentators included Sonia Mkoloma. Ahead of the 2021 season, CluchTV was announced as the league's new live stream partner. Carter remained the lead commentator.

Division 1 grand finals

Dooleys State League - Waratah Cup

Netball NSW Premier League Opens

Notes
   The 2021 season was abandoned due to the COVID-19 pandemic in New South Wales.

Minor premierships

Dooleys State League - Waratah Cup

Netball NSW Premier League Opens

Awards

Nance Kenny OAM Medal
The league's MVP award is named after Nance Kenny OAM.

Notes
  The medal was shared

Netball NSW President's Medal 
Grand Final MVP

Under-23s

Grand finals

Notes
   The 2021 competition was abandoned due to the COVID-19 pandemic in New South Wales.
  The Under 23s Division ran as an Under 20s competition from 2016 to 2018.

Main sponsors

References

External links
   Netball NSW Premier League on Facebook
   Netball NSW Premier League on Twitter
 Netball NSW Premier League on Instagram

   
  
Netball leagues in Australia
2016 establishments in Australia
Sports leagues established in 2016